George Birch may refer to:

 George Birch (mayor) (died 1632), English mayor of Norwich
 George Birch (businessman) (1862–1917), Australian businessman